Laschet is a surname. Notable people with the surname include: 

Armin Laschet (born 1961), German politician
Susanne Laschet (born 1962), German philanthropist, wife of Armin

See also
Cabinet Laschet, the government of the German state of North Rhine-Westphalia since June 2017